The Wye Town Farm House is a historic home in Easton, Talbot County, Maryland, United States. It is of brick construction, one and one-half stories high and two rooms deep with a small one-story brick kitchen. A two-story addition was made in the 20th century. The original section of the house dates from about 1800.

The Wye Town Farm House was listed on the National Register of Historic Places in 1982.

References

External links
, including photo in 1980, at Maryland Historical Trust

Houses on the National Register of Historic Places in Maryland
Houses in Talbot County, Maryland
Houses completed in 1800
Historic American Buildings Survey in Maryland
National Register of Historic Places in Talbot County, Maryland